Yoon Kyung-shin (born July 7, 1973 in Seoul) is a South Korean handball manager and former player.

Playing career
Yoon Kyung-shin could play in German Handball-Bundesliga through his outstanding performances in World Championships. He played for VfL Gummersbach from 1996 to 2006, and for HSV Hamburg from 2006 to 2008. He became the top goalscorer of the Bundesliga seven times, and is currently all-time highest scoring player of Bundesliga with 2,905 goals. He was also voted the World Player of the Year by the International Handball Federation (IHF) in 2001.

He played more than 260 games for the South Korea national handball team, and was top goalscorer at three World Championships and one Summer Olympics. He was South Korean flag bearer at the 2012 Summer Olympics.

Honours

Player
HSV Hamburg
DHB-Supercup: 2006
EHF Cup Winners' Cup: 2006–07

Doosan Handball
Handball Korea League: 2011

South Korea
Asian Games: 1990, 1994, 1998, 2002, 2010
Asian Championship: 1993, 2000, 2010, 2012

Individual
IHF World Player of the Year: 2001
Summer Olympics top goalscorer: 2004
World Championship top goalscorer: 1993, 1995, 1997
World Championship All-Star Team: 1995, 2001
Handball-Bundesliga top goalscorer: 1996–97, 1998–99, 1999–2000, 2000–01, 2001–02, 2003–04, 2006–07
EHF Cup Winners' Cup top goalscorer: 2006–07

Records
Handball-Bundesliga all-time top goalscorer: 2,905 goals
Most goals in a single Summer Olympics: 58 goals

Manager
Doosan Handball
Handball Korea League: 2013, 2015, 2016, 2017, 2018–19, 2019–20

Individual
Handball Korea League Best Manager: 2013, 2015, 2016, 2017, 2018–19, 2019–20

Personal 
His younger brother Yoon Kyung-min was also a handball player.

References

External links

1973 births
Living people
South Korean expatriates in Germany
South Korean male handball players
Expatriate handball players
Olympic handball players of South Korea
Handball players at the 1992 Summer Olympics
Handball players at the 2000 Summer Olympics
Handball players at the 2004 Summer Olympics
Handball players at the 2008 Summer Olympics
Handball players at the 2012 Summer Olympics
Handball players from Seoul
Kyung Hee University alumni
Asian Games medalists in handball
Handball players at the 1990 Asian Games
Handball players at the 1994 Asian Games
Handball players at the 1998 Asian Games
Handball players at the 2002 Asian Games
Handball players at the 2006 Asian Games
Handball players at the 2010 Asian Games
Asian Games gold medalists for South Korea
Medalists at the 1990 Asian Games
Medalists at the 1994 Asian Games
Medalists at the 1998 Asian Games
Medalists at the 2002 Asian Games
Medalists at the 2010 Asian Games